Henry Hodges (born 1993) is an American actor and singer.

Henry Hodges may also refer to:
Henry Hodges (jurist) (1844–1919), Australian judge
Henry C. Hodges (1831–1917), US Army officer
Henry Clay Hodges Jr. (1860–1963), US Army officer
Henry W. M. Hodges (1920–1997), British archaeologist

See also 
 Henry Hodge (1944–2009), English judge